Route 635, or Highway 635, may refer to:

Canada
 New Brunswick Route 635
Saskatchewan Highway 635

United Kingdom
 A635 road

United States
  Interstate 635